Jéssica de Barros Augusto,  (born 8 November 1981) is a Portuguese runner who competes in cross country, road running and in middle-distance and long-distance track events. At club level, she represents Sporting CP.

Augusto has enjoyed much success at the European Cross Country Championships. She won the event in 2010, was the runner-up in 2008, and shared in the team gold on three occasions. She was the first European-born runner to finish at the 2010 IAAF World Cross Country Championships, although she was 21st overall. She has represented Portugal in three World Championships in Athletics and at the 2008 Beijing Olympics and the 2012 London Olympics.

She has won medals on the track at minor championships, including golds at the 2007 Summer Universiade and 2009 Lusophony Games. In road running, her greatest achievement is a win at the 2009 Great North Run, where she set a half marathon best of 1:09:08. She has also won at the Cursa Bombers, and finished second at both the São Silvestre de Lisboa and Great South Run.

Career
Starting out in cross country running, she took gold in the junior race at the 2000 European Cross Country Championships. Her first appearance on the world stage on the track came in the 5000 metres at the 2005 World Championships, but she finished last in her heat. She enjoyed success at the Ibero American Championships however, taking gold in the 3000 m in 2004 and 2006. She led the Portuguese women to the team gold at the 2006 European Cross Country Championships. Competing at the Athletics at the 2007 Summer Universiade, Augusto set Universiade record on the way to winning the 5000 metres.

She was the 2008 Portuguese cross country champion and went on to take the silver medal at the 2008 European Cross Country Championships. She began to apply herself to the steeplechase and set the Portuguese record in 2008. She competed in two disciplines at the 2008 Beijing Olympics (5000 m and steeplechase) but failed to reach the final of either event.

In the following season, a fourth-place finish at the 2009 European Cross Country Championships meant she missed out on an individual medal, although she again headed Portugal to the women's team gold. She became the 1500 m champion of the 2009 Lusophony Games in July. Competing at the 2009 World Championships in Athletics, she reached the final of the 3000 metres steeplechase and finished 11th overall. When years later, in 2015, Spanish athlete Marta Domínguez was banned for three years by the Court of Arbitration for Sport because of her ties to doping as well as issues with her biological passport and as a result, saw all her results from 5 August 2009 until 8 July 2013 being nullified, Augusto's 11th place turned into a 10th overall. Augusto won the Great North Run in 2009, recording a time of 1:09:08 for the half marathon race. She fended off compatriots Inês Monteiro and Anália Rosa to win the 2009 Oeiras International Cross Country meeting.

She ran in the 3000 m at the 2010 IAAF World Indoor Championships and she finished in eighth place in the final. She was 21st at the 2010 IAAF World Cross Country Championships, but despite this she was the first European-born runner to cross the line. After a win at the Cursa Bombers in a 10 km personal best of 32:08, she stated that she was looking to attempt longer distance races, including the 10,000 metres on the track. She improved her 10K best further to 31:47 minutes with a runner-up performance at the Great Manchester Run. At the 2010 Ibero-American Championships, she won the bronze medal in the 1500 m but she was dissatisfied with the performance, despite running a personal best of 4:08.32. Augusto entered the 3000 m where she promptly ran a championship record of 8:46.59, the fastest run by a European at that point in the year. She ran a Portuguese record of 9:18:54 in the 3000 m steeplechase later that month, finishing behind Marta Domínguez at the Gran Premio de Andalucía.

She recorded a personal best in the 5000 metres at the Meeting Areva Diamond League competition, knocking over 20 seconds off her previous time with a run of 14:37.07 for fifth place. At the 2010 European Athletics Championships she was some distance behind Elvan Abeylegesse in the 10,000 m, who completed a solo run to victory, but she was still the clear bronze medallist – her first podium finish on the track at continental level. She represented Europe over 5000 m at the 2010 IAAF Continental Cup but only managed seventh place. Her end of year focus was the 2010 European Cross Country Championships held on home soil in Albufeira. She led the race from virtually start to finish and openly celebrated to the home crowd in the final straight, such was the size of her lead. Her win also brought the Portuguese women the team gold for the third year running. She ended the year with a win at the San Silvestre Vallecana 10K race in Madrid, where she again completed a gun-to-tape victory.

She took on Anna Incerti at the Roma-Ostia Half Marathon in February 2011, but was beaten by the Italian's pace and had to settle for second. She made her debut over the marathon distance in April at the 2011 London Marathon and she recorded a time of 2:24:33 hours for eighth position. She was second behind her fellow Portuguese and friend Ana Dulce Félix at the Austrian Women's Run after beginning the race with an excessive pace. She came tenth in the 10,000 m at the 2011 World Championships in Athletics. On the roads, she was runner-up at the Great North Run, won the Ovar Half Marathon, but failed to finish at the 2011 New York City Marathon.

In her second marathon finish she gave a similar performance at the 2012 London Marathon, taking eighth in just under two hours and 25 minutes. Augusto represented Portugal at the London 2012 Olympic marathon and placed seventh, first among the Portuguese. Her only international appearance of 2013 came at the European Team Championships, where she was fifth in the 3000 m. She was in the top ten at the Great North Run and Portugal Half Marathon, but reached the podium at the Yokohama Women's Marathon, coming third.

Despite the fact that she is currently a mother, she plans to participate in 2016 Rio Olympic Games.

Achievements

Personal bests
800 metres – 2:10.59 min (2001), indoor – 2:05.97 min (2002)
1000 metres – 2:47.5 min (2001)
1500 metres – 4:08.23 min (2010), indoor – 4:07.89 min (2009)
Mile run – 4:45.15 min (1999), indoor – 4:32.18 min (2009)
3000 metres – 8:41.35 min (2007)
3000 metres steeplechase – 9:18:45 min NR (2010)
5000 metres – 14:37.18 min (2010)
10,000 metres – 31:15.78 min (2010)
Half marathon – 1:09:58 hrs (2011)
Marathon – 2:24:37 hrs (2014)

References

External links
Official website 

1981 births
Living people
Portuguese female middle-distance runners
Portuguese female long-distance runners
Portuguese female marathon runners
Portuguese female steeplechase runners
Athletes (track and field) at the 2008 Summer Olympics
Athletes (track and field) at the 2012 Summer Olympics
Athletes (track and field) at the 2016 Summer Olympics
Olympic athletes of Portugal
European Athletics Championships medalists
World Athletics Championships athletes for Portugal
Universiade medalists in athletics (track and field)
Athletes from Paris
European Cross Country Championships winners
Universiade gold medalists for Portugal